Mr. Duck Steps Out is a Donald Duck cartoon produced by Walt Disney Productions, which is released on June 7, 1940, and featured the debut of Daisy Duck. The short was directed by Jack King and written by Carl Barks, Chuck Couch, Jack Hannah, Harry Reeves, Milt Schaffer, and Frank Tashlin.

Clarence Nash performs all the voices in the film—Donald, Daisy and Donald's nephews.

Plot
Donald visits the house of his new love interest, Daisy, for their first known date. Donald tried to woo her and hug her, but at first Daisy acts shy and has her back turned to her visitor. But Donald soon notices her tail feathers taking the form of a hand and signaling for him to come closer. But their time alone is soon interrupted by Huey, Dewey, and Louie who have just followed their uncle and clearly compete with him for the attention of Daisy.

Donald and the nephews take turns dancing the jitterbug with her while trying to get rid of each other. In their final effort the three younger ducks feed their uncle maize in the process of becoming popcorn. The process is completed within Donald himself who continues to move wildly around the house while maintaining the appearance of dancing. The short ends with an impressed Daisy showering her new lover with red kisses.

History
The short stands out among other Donald shorts of the period for its use of modern music and surreal situations throughout. After this short, the idea of a permanent love interest for Donald was well established. However, Daisy did not appear as regularly as Donald himself.

In later versions of this short, Daisy's lines were re-dubbed by June Foray.

Releases
1940 – Theatrical release
1961 – Walt Disney's Wonderful World of Color, episode #8.6: "Inside Donald Duck" (TV)
1977 – Donald and His Duckling Gang (theatrical)
c. 1983 – Good Morning, Mickey!, episode #61 (TV)
1984 – "From Disney, With Love" (TV)
c. 1992 – Mickey's Mouse Tracks, episode #31 (TV)
c. 1992 – Donald's Quack Attack, episode #45 (TV)
1994 – "Love Tales" (VHS)
1997 – The Ink and Paint Club, episode #1.20: "Huey, Dewey & Louie" (TV)
1998 – The Ink and Paint Club, episode #1.40: "Crazy Over Daisy" (TV)

Home media
The short has been re-released on home media multiple times since its first distribution. These releases include:
1984 – "Cartoon Classics - Limited Gold Edition: Daisy" (VHS)
1994 – "Love Tales" (VHS)
2004 – "Mickey and Minnie's Sweetheart Stories" (DVD))
2004 - "Walt Disney Treasures: The Chronological Donald, Volume One: 1934-1941" (DVD)
2006 – "Classic Cartoon Favorites: Best Pals - Donald and Daisy" (DVD)
2019 – Disney+ (Streaming)

References

 Douglas L. McCall, Film Cartoons: A Guide to 20th Century American Animated Features and Shorts, McFarland, 2015, p. 166.

External links
 
 
 

1940 films
1940s Disney animated short films
Donald Duck short films
1940 comedy films
1940 animated films
Films directed by Jack King
Films produced by Walt Disney
American comedy short films
1940 short films
Films with screenplays by Carl Barks
American animated short films
1940s English-language films
Films about ducks